Michel Lagace (born October 16, 1936) was a Canadian ice hockey player with the Trail Smoke Eaters. He won a gold medal at the 1961 World Ice Hockey Championships in Switzerland. He also played with the Montreal Royals, St. Paul Saints and Quebec Aces.

References

1936 births
Living people
Canadian ice hockey right wingers
Ice hockey people from Quebec City